Tel Anafa (lit. "Egret hill" , lit. "The green hill") is an archaeological site and nature reserve in the Upper Galilee, Israel.

History
Tel Anafa was inhabited from the Early Bronze Age through the early Roman period, but most of the significant archaeological remains are from the Hellenistic period.

In the late Hellenistic period, 125-80 BCE, the site was occupied by a large building with a central courtyard. The site was abandoned after 80 BCE and resettled in the last decade of the century. This early Roman phase continued until the mid 1st century CE when the site was abandoned once again. Coins and amphora handles from the late 4th to the 2nd century were unearthed.

The land on which it is situated has since 1984 been part of an 11-dunam nature reserve.

See also
National parks and nature reserves of Israel

References

Further reading

.
 Sharon C. Herbert, Tel Anafa I, i and ii, Final Report on Ten Years of Excavation at a Hellenistic and Roman Settlement in Northern Israel (Ann Arbor: Kelsey Museum 1994) (Journal of Roman Archaeology, Suppl. 10, I, i and ii; Kelsey Museum Fieldwork Series); Andrea Berlin and Kathleen Warner Slane, Tel Anafa II, i, The Hellenistic and Roman Pottery (Ann Arbor: Kelsey Museum 1997) (Journal of Roman Archaeology, Suppl. 10, II, i; Kelsey Museum Fieldwork Series).
 Saul S. Weinberg, Tel Anafa : the Hellenistic town (Jerusalem : National Museum 1970)

Archaeological sites in Israel
Nature reserves in Israel
Ancient Greek archaeological sites in Western Asia
Hellenistic sites
Classical sites in Israel
Historic sites in Israel